The 2016–17 UEFA Women's Champions League was the 16th edition of the European women's club football championship organised by UEFA, and the 8th edition since being rebranded as the UEFA Women's Champions League.

The final was held at the Cardiff City Stadium in Cardiff, Wales on 1 June 2017, two days before the final of the men's tournament played at the Millennium Stadium.

Lyon were the defending champions, and successfully defended their title after defeating Paris Saint-Germain in the final 7–6 on penalties after a goalless draw, and equalled Frankfurt's record of four European titles.

Expansion
The tournament was expanded such that the top 12 national associations (instead of the previous top 8) in the rankings were allowed to enter two teams in the competition.

The change has been criticized, as it broadens the tournament but doesn't add teams from top countries. The lack of an increase in prize-money also has been criticized. For the first time the clubs receive money for flights to away games. The amount increases from €12,000 over €17,000 to €20,000 based on flight time.

Association team allocation
A total of 59 teams from 47 of the 55 UEFA member associations participated in the 2016–17 UEFA Women's Champions League, which was a record number of entries. The ranking based on the UEFA Women's Champions League association coefficient is used to determine the number of participating teams for each association:
Associations 1–12 each have two teams qualify.
All other associations, should they enter, each have one team qualify.
The winners of the 2015–16 UEFA Women's Champions League were given an additional entry if they do not qualify for the 2016–17 UEFA Women's Champions League through their domestic league. Since the title holders Lyon qualified through their domestic league, the additional entry for the Champions League title holders was not necessary for this season.

Association ranking
For the 2016–17 UEFA Women's Champions League, the associations were allocated places according to their 2015 UEFA Women's Champions League association coefficient, which takes into account their performance in European competitions from 2010–11 to 2014–15.

Scotland for the first time receive two entries in the UEFA Women's Champions League.

Notes
 – Additional berth for title holders
 – Did not enter
 – No rank (association did not enter in the five seasons used for computing coefficients)

Distribution
The format of the competition remains unchanged from previous years, starting from the qualifying round, which is played as mini-tournaments with four teams in each group, followed by the knockout phase starting from the round of 32, which is played as home-and-away two-legged ties except for the one-match final.

Unlike the men's Champions League, not every association enters a team, and so the exact number of teams in each round (qualifying round and round of 32) can not be determined until the full entry list is known. In general, the title holders, the champions of the top 12 associations, plus the runners-up of highest-ranked associations (exact number depending on the number of entries) receive a bye to the round of 32. All other teams (runners-up of lowest-ranked associations plus champions of associations starting from 13th) enter the qualifying round, with the group winners plus a maximum of two best runners-up advancing to the round of 32 to join the direct qualifiers.

With 59 entries for this season, the lowest-ranked 36 teams enter the qualifying round (9 groups), with only the 9 group winners advancing to the round of 32 to join the 23 direct qualifiers.

Teams
The following list the teams that qualified and entered this season's competition. Here CH denotes the national champion, RU the national runner-up. Entries from 49 associations were possible. Three associations have no current league (Azerbaijan, Liechtenstein, San Marino). Azerbaijan only has junior leagues and teams from Liechtenstein play in the Swiss leagues. Gibraltar's league is only nine-a-side for 2015/16 and Andorra's is only five-a-side. Thus they are ineligible as well. Armenia has a regular league with an 11-a-side champion crowned for autumn and summer, but hasn't registered for European competition the last years. Also Georgia and Luxembourg did not enter a team. It's the first time a club (men or women) from Kosovo enters a UEFA competition.

Round and draw dates
UEFA has scheduled the competition as follows (all draws are held at the UEFA headquarters in Nyon, Switzerland).

Qualifying round

The draw was held on 24 June 2016, 13:30 CEST, at the UEFA headquarters in Nyon, Switzerland. The 36 teams were allocated into four seeding positions based on their UEFA club coefficients at the beginning of the season. They were drawn into nine groups of four containing one team from each of the four seeding positions. First, the nine teams which were pre-selected as hosts were drawn from their own designated pot and allocated to their respective group as per their seeding positions. Next, the remaining 27 teams were drawn from their respective pot which were allocated according to their seeding positions.

In each group, teams play against each other in a round-robin mini-tournament at the pre-selected hosts. The nine group winners advance to the round of 32 to join the 23 teams which qualified directly. The matchdays are 23, 25 and 28 August 2016.

Group 1

Group 2

Group 3

Group 4

Group 5

Group 6

Group 7

Group 8

Group 9

Knockout phase

In the knockout phase, teams play against each other over two legs on a home-and-away basis, except for the one-match final. The mechanism of the draws for each round is as follows:
In the draw for the round of 32, the sixteen teams with the highest UEFA coefficients are seeded (with the title holders being the automatic top seed), and the other sixteen teams are unseeded. The seeded teams are drawn against the unseeded teams, with the seeded teams hosting the second leg. Teams from the same association cannot be drawn against each other.
In the draw for the round of 16, the eight teams with the highest UEFA coefficients are seeded (with the title holders being the automatic top seed should they qualify), and the other eight teams are unseeded. The seeded teams are drawn against the unseeded teams, with the order of legs decided by draw. Teams from the same association cannot be drawn against each other.
In the draws for the quarter-finals onwards, there are no seedings, and teams from the same association can be drawn against each other.

Bracket

Round of 32
The draw for the round of 32 was held on 1 September 2016, 13:30 CEST, at the UEFA headquarters in Nyon, Switzerland.

Round of 16
The draw for the round of 16 was held on 17 October 2016, 13:30 CEST, at the UEFA headquarters in Nyon, Switzerland.

Quarter-finals
The draws for the quarter-finals and semi-finals was held on 25 November 2016, 13:30 CET, at the UEFA headquarters in Nyon, Switzerland.

Semi-finals

Final

The final was played on 1 June 2017 at the Cardiff City Stadium in Cardiff, Wales. The "home" team (for administrative purposes) was determined by an additional draw held after the quarter-final and semi-final draws.

Statistics
Qualifying goals count towards the topscorer award.

Top goalscorers

Top assists

Squad of the season
The UEFA technical study group selected the following 18 players as the squad of the tournament:

See also
2016–17 UEFA Champions League

References

External links
2016–17 UEFA Women's Champions League
European league standings

 
2016-17
Women's Champions League
2016 in women's association football
2017 in women's association football